Lucky Dan is a 1922 American silent action film directed by William K. Howard and starring Richard Talmadge, George A. Williams and Dorothy Wood.

Plot

Cast
 Richard Talmadge as Lucky Dan
 George A. Williams as Father of The Girl
 Dorothy Wood as The Girl
 S.E. Jennings as Slim Connors

References

Bibliography
 Connelly, Robert B. The Silents: Silent Feature Films, 1910-36, Volume 40, Issue 2. December Press, 1998.
 Munden, Kenneth White. The American Film Institute Catalog of Motion Pictures Produced in the United States, Part 1. University of California Press, 1997.

External links
 

1922 films
1920s action films
American silent feature films
American action films
American black-and-white films
Films directed by William K. Howard
1920s English-language films
1920s American films